Olatz Ganboa Pilar (born January 2, 1985, Getxo, Spain) is a Spanish film, theater and television actress.

In 2018 she was nominated for best actress award at the Ercilla Awards. She has worked in more than a hundred theatre productions.

Life and career 

She studied the licenciate degree in journalism in the University of the Basque Country (2003-2008). She then studied the bachelor's degree in Dramatic Art at the Getxo Theatre School (2007-2011). There she met the actors Lander Otaola, Alvar Gordejuela and Alex Ygartua. With the latter he represented ¡Ay, Carmela! for several years.

After that, for 7 years, she took numerous interpretation, dance, and singing courses, both in Spain and in Argentina (Buenos Aires). She began by being part of the hACERIA and Pabellón 6 in Bilbao.

In 2014 she received the award for best leading actress at the II Biescas Theater Contest in the role of Carmela in the play ¡Ay, Carmela!. In 2018 she was nominated for the Ercilla Award for best revelation performer for the plays Lyceum Club and La casa de Bernarda Alba.

In 2019 they won the Ercilla Award for Best Basque Production 2019 for the play ¡Ay, Carmela!. In 2020 she was nominated for Best Theater Actress at the Union of Basque Actors and Actresses Awards (Besarkada Awards) for the work ¡Ay, Carmela!.

In 2021 she was one of the presenters of the Max Awards.

Private life 
He currently lives in Bilbao. He is in a relationship with actor Mikel Losada. In 2016 he and Ganboa represented Los amantes del Casco Viejo, a theatre production of the Arriaga Theatre. They also recorded the series Etxekoak together, on ETB 1, in full confinement due to the COVID pandemic in 2020.

His father is Jon Ander Gamboa, General Secretary of the Basque Football Federation between 1993 and 2014.

Filmography

Film 

 Ziren (2017)
 Embarazados (2016)
 Tres mentiras (2013)

Television 

 Kerman mintzalagun (2010)
 Etxekoak (2020)
 Objetivo Bizkaia (guest/interviewed)

Stage 

 La lucha por la vida (2023), dir. Ramon Barea
 Simplicissimus (2018-2020)
 La casa de Bernarda Alba (2017)
 A Midsummer Night's Dream (2016)
 Los amantes del Casco Viejo (2016)
 Caperucita Feroz (2015)
 Chichinabo Cabaret (2015)
 Cabaret Chihuahua (2015)
 ¡Ay Carmela! (2011-2023)
 La comedia sin título (2010)

Awards

Ercilla Awards

Union of Basque Actors and Actresses Awards

See also 

 Ramón Barea

References

External links 

 

1978 births
Living people
People from Bilbao
20th-century Spanish actors
21st-century Spanish actors
Spanish stage actors
Spanish film actors
Spanish television actors